Vol. 1 is the debut studio album by American Electronic Art rock band The Tempers, self-released on 31 October 2010.
A Music video for the track "Alone Again" was released following Vol. 1.

Track listing
All tracks written and composed by The Tempers

Personnel
Corina Bakker- Vocals, Artwork
Chalia Bakker- Drums
James Bakker- Synthesizer, Bass, Guitar, Engineer
Lee Blackwell- Guitar Soloist (4)
Elisa Bakker- Cello (2, 9)
Will Klintberg- Guitar "whale calls" (2)
Ronnie Champagne- Drum Engineer (9)
Eddy Schreyer/ Oasis- Mastering
Photographers- Frank Correa, Nick Bartoletti, Elisa Bakker, The Tempers, Lord Fotog, Aaron Lugg, Damien Goyenechea, Mike De Leon

References

2010 albums
The Tempers albums